Sarau can mean:
 Sarau (event), a cultural, music, or sporting event of Portuguese/Brazilian origin
 Groß Sarau, municipality in Schleswig-Holstein, Germany

See also:
 Upper Moutere, New Zealand, originally called Sarau
 Jeff Sarau, Australian rules footballer
 Gheorghe Sarău, Romanian linguist